Shin Jee-yeon (born 17 September 1967) is a South Korean lawyer who served as the private secretary to the President Moon Jae-in at the Office of the President. She is the first woman to become the private secretary to the South Korean president and the first person to have served as private secretary to both the president and their spouse.

Shin was the deputy spokesperson for foreign press at Moon's first presidential campaign in 2012 which she joined after working for major law firms - Kim & Chang and Bae, Kim & Lee - and Samsung Engineering. She joined Moon's campaign again in 2017 as his coordinator for personal image. She was foreign press secretary in the beginning of President Moon's term but later reshuffled to private secretary to first lady Kim Jung-sook and now President Moon.

She holds a B.A. in Political Science from the University of Michigan and a  J.D. from New York Law School in June 1998.

References 

1967 births
Living people
University of Michigan alumni
New York Law School alumni
People from Busan
South Korean government officials
21st-century South Korean lawyers
South Korean women lawyers